Interstate 99 (I-99) is an Interstate Highway in the United States with two segments: one located in central Pennsylvania and the other in southern New York. The southern terminus of the route is near exit 146 of the Pennsylvania Turnpike (I-70/I-76) north of Bedford, where the road continues south as U.S. Route 220 (US 220). The northern terminus of the Pennsylvania segment is near exit 161 of I-80 near Bellefonte. The New York segment follows US 15 from the Pennsylvania–New York border to an interchange with I-86 in Corning. Within Pennsylvania, I-99 passes through Altoona and State College—the latter home to the Pennsylvania State University—and is entirely concurrent with US 220. Long-term plans call for the two segments of I-99 to be connected using portions of I-80, US 220, and US 15 through Pennsylvania.

Unlike most Interstate Highway numbers, which were assigned by the American Association of State Highway and Transportation Officials (AASHTO) to fit into a grid, I-99's number was written into Section 332 of the National Highway System Designation Act of 1995 by Bud Shuster, then-chair of the US House Committee on Transportation and Infrastructure, the bill's sponsor, and the representative of the district through which the highway runs. I-99 violates the AASHTO numbering convention associated with Interstate Highways, as it should lie to the east of I-97 but instead lies east of I-79 and west of I-81.

Route description

|-
|
|
|-
|
|
|-
|Total
|
|}

Pennsylvania
I-99 begins at an indirect interchange with US 220 and the Pennsylvania Turnpike (I-70/I-76) north of Bedford. It begins concurrent with US 220, which continues south from the interchange toward the Maryland state line as a two-lane highway known as the Appalachian Thruway. To access the turnpike, drivers are required to use a short segment of US 220 Business (US 220 Bus.). North of the turnpike junction, the limited-access highway becomes the Bud Shuster Highway as it heads through a rural portion of Bedford County. It connects to Pennsylvania Route 56 (PA 56) just west of Bedford County Airport at exit 3 and PA 869 at exit 7 before crossing into Blair County. Here, it meets PA 164 north of East Freedom at exit 23 prior to entering the Altoona area.

In Hollidaysburg, a borough south of the city, I-99 and US 220 connect to US 22 at exit 28, a large modified trumpet interchange. This junction allows travelers to head west toward Ebensburg, Johnstown, and Pittsburgh. The freeway continues to Altoona itself, where it indirectly connects to PA 36 via exit 32. Unlike the original routing of US 220 which goes through the city center, I-99 and US 220 mostly bypass it to the east, connecting to the city via streets leading eastward from the downtown district. At the northern edge of Altoona, PA 764 joins the old alignment of US 220 and parallels I-99 north for  toward Bellwood. Bellwood itself is served by exit 41, which leads to PA 865.

The highway veers northeastward from Bellwood to serve the borough of Tyrone, located at the junction of old US 220 and PA 453. Access to the borough is made by way of exit 48, which serves PA 453. Past Tyrone, I-99 and US 220 head through sparsely populated areas of Blair and Centre counties. For this reason, only three exits exist between Tyrone and State College: exit 52, serving PA 350 and the small community of Bald Eagle, and exits 61 and 62, which connect to US 322 and the borough of Port Matilda. Here, US 322 joins I-99 and US 220 and follows them eastward to the State College area.

At exit 68 (US 322 Bus.), I-99 merges into the Mount Nittany Expressway, an older, northerly bypass of State College. I-99, US 220, and US 322 follow the expressway to the Mount Nittany Interchange, a directional T interchange located on the northern fringe of the Pennsylvania State University campus. Beaver Stadium, the home of the Penn State Nittany Lions football team, is visible from I-99 at this point. US 322 continues east through the interchange to follow the Mount Nittany Expressway while I-99 and US 220 split from US 322 and head northeastward toward Pleasant Gap, which I-99 connects to via exit 81 and PA 26. At this point, PA 26 joins the freeway and follows it to Bellefonte, served by exit 83 and PA 550.

New York

The northern segment of I-99 is entirely concurrent with US 15 and starts at the Pennsylvania–New York border north of Lawrenceville, Pennsylvania. A four-lane freeway through the Steuben County town of Lindley, I-99 crosses through a rock cut, making a large bend to the north and bypassing the hamlet of Presho. The freeway enters a partial cloverleaf interchange with County Route 5 (CR 5; Smith Road). After CR 5, I-99 turns northeast through the town of Erwin, running to the west of the Indian Hills Golf Club. Making a gradual bend further to the northeast, the freeway crosses the Canisteo River and enters the hamlet of Erwins, where it enters a diamond interchange with New York State Route 417 (NY 417; Addison Road). After NY 417, it then turns alongside Norfolk Southern Railway's Southern Tier Line (former Erie Railroad main line). Now paralleling the tracks and NY 417, I-99/US 15 crosses through Erwin, entering exit 11, which connects to NY 417 once again, next to Gang Mills Yard, the site of former Painted Post station.

After Gang Mills Yard, I-99 crosses through the Gang Mills section of Erwin, entering a large interchange at the northern end of the neighborhood. Signed exit 12, this interchange serves CR 107 (Robert Dann Drive) via NY 417. After CR 107, I-99 enters a large interchange that utilizes several flyover ramps between I-99, US 15, I-86, and NY 17 (Southern Tier Expressway). Ramps are also present, connecting to NY 352. This interchange serves as the northern terminus of both I-99 and US 15.

History

Origins

Corridor O of the Appalachian Development Highway System was assigned in 1965, running from Cumberland, Maryland (Corridor E, now I-68) to Bellefonte (I-80) along US 220. The portion in Pennsylvania, from Bedford north to Bald Eagle, was upgraded to a freeway in stages from the 1960s to the 1990s. The first section, from US 30 in Bedford to PA 56 near Cessna, opened in the latter half of the 1960s. Two more sections—from PA 56 north to modern exit 15 in Blair County and from Charlottsville (exit 45) to Bald Eagle—were completed in the 1970s. The portion between exit 15 and Altoona (exit 33) was finished in the 1980s while the segment between modern exits 33 and 45 was opened by 1997.

In 1991, the Intermodal Surface Transportation Efficiency Act (ISTEA) was signed into law. It included a number of High Priority Corridors, one of which—Corridor 9—ran along US 220 from Bedford to Williamsport, and then north on US 15 to Corning, New York. The National Highway System Designation Act of 1995 amended ISTEA; among these amendments were that "the portion of the route referred to in subsection (c)(9) [Corridor 9] is designated as Interstate Route I-99". This was the first Interstate Highway number to be written into law rather than to be assigned by AASHTO. The number was specified by Representative Bud Shuster, who said that the standard spur numbering was not "catchy"; instead, I-99 was named after a street car, No. 99, that took people from Shuster's hometown of Glassport to McKeesport. I-99 violates the AASHTO numbering convention associated with Interstate Highways, since it lies east of I-79 but west of I-81.

Designation and Bald Eagle Mountain
On November 6, 1998, AASHTO formally approved the I-99 designation, which initially extended  from the Pennsylvania Turnpike in Bedford to PA 350 in Bald Eagle. In 2002, plans were set in motion to extend I-99 northeast from Bald Eagle to State College via Port Matilda. The extension was fraught with issues, however. The proposed alignment for the highway north to Port Matilda proved to be controversial: while environmentalists called for I-99 to be constructed in the valley below Bald Eagle Mountain, the Pennsylvania Department of Transportation (PennDOT) and valley residents favored a routing that took the freeway above the valley and along the side of the ridge. Farther north, the widening of Skytop, the mountain cut that US 322 uses to traverse Bald Eagle Mountain, resulted in the exposure of acidic pyrite rock in 2003.

Work on the segment ceased one year later as PennDOT attempted to stop the flow of acidic runoff from the site. The state remedied the situation by removing  of pyrite and replacing it with a mix of limestone and fill, a process that took two years and cost $83 million (equivalent to $ in ). With the environmental issues settled, construction resumed on the portion of the freeway south of Skytop Mountain. The section from Bald Eagle to Port Matilda was opened to traffic on December 17, 2007, while the remaining section between Port Matilda and the west end of the Mount Nittany Expressway near State College was completely opened on November 17, 2008. In all, the Bald Eagle–State College section of I-99 cost $631 million (equivalent to $ in ) to construct.

I-99 was extended northeastward to meet I-80 northeast of Bellefonte following the completion of the Bald Eagle–State College segment. The connection was made by way of the preexisting Mount Nittany Expressway and another, unnamed limited-access highway connecting the State College bypass to the Bellefonte area. The portion of the latter highway north of the PA 26 interchange was originally built in the 1970s as a two-lane freeway connecting Pleasant Gap to I-80. At the time, it was designated solely as PA 26. It was widened to four lanes in 1997. The piece connecting the PA 26 freeway to the Mount Nittany Expressway was completed in 2002. US 220 was rerouted via US 322 and the new road, and the old alignment of US 220 north of US 322 was designated US 220 Alternate (US 220 Alt.) on May 30, 2003.

Further north, one short segment of two-lane highway remained between Lawrenceville, Pennsylvania, and Presho, New York, almost entirely within New York. In the early 2010s,  of new freeway was constructed to connect the existing freeway segments. This provided through traffic with a continuous freeway from Williamsport, Pennsylvania, to Corning, New York, and removed traffic from the overburdened two-lane section of US 15, which was retired to county route status as CR 115. On June 27, 2014, New York Governor Andrew Cuomo announced that the Interstate-grade US 15 freeway from the Pennsylvania border to I-86 in Corning was officially signed as I-99.

Future

Though there is no specific date for completion: long-term plans call for the two segments of I-99 to be connected via US 220 from Bellefonte to Williamsport, running concurrent with I-80 as US 220 currently does, and continue northward along US 15 from Williamsport to the New York border. The entire portion of US 15 involved has been upgraded to Interstate Highway standards in anticipation of the I-99 designation, but some sections of US 220 still require upgrades, primarily in the vicinity of both interchanges with I-80. Signs have been erected along the present US 220 and US 15 between Bellefonte and Corning marking the route as the "Future I-99 Corridor". Some of this section of road has also received exit number designations.

PennDOT has plans to build a high-speed interchange connecting I-99 to I-80 near Bellefonte. The new interchange will eliminate local access between PA 26 (Jacksonville Road) and I-80, which is provided by a new exit  to the east. The first phase of the project built the local access interchange between PA 26 and I-80. Bidding on the local access interchange began on April 23, 2020, and construction began on July 27, 2020. The local access interchange was opened to traffic on November 10, 2022, with a ribbon-cutting ceremony held. The local access interchange between PA 26 and I-80 was funded by a $34-million federal grant. The second phase of the project will make improvements to Jacksonville Road between the new interchange and the junction between I-80 along with building the high-speed interchange between I-80 and I-99. Bidding on the second phase is planned to begin in March 2022, with the improvements to Jacksonville Road to be finished by December 2023 and the high-speed interchange to be completed by December 2025.

The idea posits that I-390 is a logical extension of the I-99 corridor because I-99's predecessor, US 15, originally extended to Rochester. No official moves to accomplish this have been taken.

Exit list

See also

References

External links

 Interstate Guide - I-99
 I-99 in Pennsylvania at AARoads.com
 I-99/US 15 in New York at AARoads.com
 Pennsylvania Highways: Interstate 99 

 Pennsylvania Roads - I-99

99
099
099
Interstate 99
Interstate 99
Transportation in Bedford County, Pennsylvania
Transportation in Blair County, Pennsylvania
Transportation in Centre County, Pennsylvania
Transportation in Steuben County, New York